Maria "Rie" Vierdag (22 September 1905 – 17 July 2005) was a Dutch freestyle swimmer who competed at the 1924, 1928 and 1932 Summer Olympics. She won a silver medal in the 4×100 m relay in 1932, setting a European record, and finished sixth in 1924. She failed to reach the 100 m finals at all Games.

Vierdag was a European champion in the 100 m in 1927 and in the 4×100 m relay in 1931. In 1927 she finished her 100 m race in the same time as Joyce Cooper, and an addition trial was arranged between them. Cooper was too tired to attend it, and Vierdag was announced as the winner.

Nationally Vierdag set eight Dutch records, yet won only one national title, in the 100 m in 1929. In retirement she worked as a physical education teacher and physical therapist.

References

1905 births
2005 deaths
Dutch female freestyle swimmers
Olympic swimmers of the Netherlands
Swimmers at the 1924 Summer Olympics
Swimmers at the 1928 Summer Olympics
Swimmers at the 1932 Summer Olympics
Olympic silver medalists for the Netherlands
Medalists at the 1932 Summer Olympics
European Aquatics Championships medalists in swimming
Sportspeople from Amersfoort
Olympic silver medalists in swimming
20th-century Dutch women